Broughton may refer to:

People
Broughton (name)

Places

Australia
 Broughton, Queensland, a locality in the Charters Towers Region, Queensland
 Broughton, Victoria

Canada
 Broughton, Nova Scotia
 Broughton Archipelago, British Columbia
 Broughton Island (British Columbia), an island in that archipelago
 North Broughton Island, to the north of Broughton Island
 Broughton Point, on the south coast of North Broughton Island
the Broughton Strait off the north coast of Vancouver Island, between that island and Queen Charlotte Strait
the Broughton Peaks, a small group of peaks in the Barkley Sound region of the west coast of Vancouver Island

Jamaica
 Broughton, Jamaica

United Kingdom

England
 Broughton, Aylesbury, Buckinghamshire
 Broughton, Cambridgeshire
 Broughton, Claverley, Shropshire, a location
 Broughton, Craven, North Yorkshire
 Broughton, Cumbria
 Broughton, Hampshire
 Broughton, Lancashire
 Broughton, Lincolnshire
 Broughton, Milton Keynes, Buckinghamshire
 Broughton, Northamptonshire
 Broughton, Oxfordshire
 Broughton, Ryedale, North Yorkshire
 Broughton, Salford, Greater Manchester
Broughton Suspension Bridge, 1831 collapse
 Broughton, Shropshire, in Myddle, Broughton and Harmer Hill
 Broughton, Staffordshire, a location
 Broughton Astley, Leicestershire
 Broughton Gifford, Wiltshire
 Broughton-in-Furness, Cumbria
 Church Broughton, Derbyshire
 Great and Little Broughton, Hambleton, North Yorkshire
 Nether Broughton, Leicestershire
 Upper Broughton, Nottinghamshire

Scotland
 Broughton, Edinburgh
 Broughton, Orkney, a location
 Broughton, Scottish Borders

Wales
 Broughton, Flintshire
 Broughton, Vale of Glamorgan
 Broughton, Wrexham

United States
 Broughton, Illinois
 Broughton, Ohio
 Broughton, Pennsylvania

Sport
 Broughton RUFC, an English rugby union club
 Broughton Park RUFC, an English rugby union club
 Broughton Rangers, an English rugby league club

Other uses 
 Broughton Anglican College, Menangle, New South Wales, Australia
 Broughton High School, Edinburgh, Scotland, United Kingdom
 Needham B. Broughton High School, Raleigh, North Carolina, United States
 Broughton Hospital, a psychiatric treatment facility, Morganton, North Carolina, United States
 Broughton House, a town house in Scotland
 Broughton House, Parramatta, a heritage-listed residence in Australia
 Broughton House, Raleigh, a mansion in Raleigh, North Carolina, United States
 Jolly-Broughton House, a mansion in Raleigh, North Carolina, United States
 Broughton (HBC vessel), see Hudson's Bay Company vessels